The Thomson TO7, also called Thomson 9000 is a home computer introduced by Thomson SA in November 1982, with an original retail price of 3750 FF.
By 1983 over 40000 units were produced. About 84 games were released for the TO7.

The TO7 is built around a 1 MHz Motorola 6809 processor. ROM cartridges, designed as MEMO7, can be introduced through a memory bay.
The user interface uses Microsoft BASIC, included in the kit cartridge. The keyboard features a plastic membrane, and further user input is obtained through a lightpen.
Cooling is provided by a rear radiator. 
A standard television can serve as a monitor using a RGB SCART (Peritel) connector, with a resolution of 320x200 (with 2 colors for each 8 x 1 pixels).

The TO7 prototype, called Thomson T9000, was developed in 1980. The differences regarding the production model are a different startup menu and buggier BIOS.

Specifications
The Thomson TO7 runs on a Motorola 6809 processor clocked at 1 MHz and features 22 KB of RAM (8 KB for the user, 8 KB used as video memory and 8K x 6 bits color memory) and 20KB of ROM (4KB for the monitor and 16KB on MEMO7 cartridges).

As common on home computers designed to be connected to an ordinary TV screen, the 320 x 200 pixels active area doesn't cover the entire screen, and is surrounded by a border. 
Graphics were limited to 8 colours (generated by combination of RGB primaries) with proximity constraints (2 colors for each 8 x 1 pixel area).
The video output is RGB on a SCART connector, with the refresh rate being 625-line compatible 50Hz.

Audio featured a single channel sound generator with five octaves. A "game expansion" was capable of four channel, six octaves sound.

The keyboard has 58 keys and includes arrow keys.

Besides cartridges, the machine used cassette tapes for file storage.

Thomson TO7/70
An upgraded version, the Thomson TO7/70, was released in 1984 with an introductory price of 3590 FF. 
It was used as an educational tool in French schools under the Computing for All plan, where the TO7/70 could be used as a used a "nano-machine" terminal for the "Nanoréseau" educational network.

Among improvements RAM was increased to 64 KB  - "70" on the version name stands for 64+6 (64KB RAM + 6KB ROM). The 6809 processor was replaced by a Motorola 6809E and the color palette was extended from 8 to 16 colors. 

Graphics were similar to the Thomson MO5 and generated by a Motorola MCA1300 gate array capable of 40×25 text display and a resolution of 320 x 200 pixels with 16 colours (limited by 8 x 1 pixel colour attribute areas). The colour palette is 4-bit RGBI, with 8 basic RGB colours and a intensity bit (called P for "Pastel") that controlled saturation ("saturated" or "pastel"). 

Software developed for the TO-7 can be run on the TO-7/70, but the reverse is not possible. At least three games were released for the TO7/70.

See also 

 Computing for All, a French government plan to introduce computers to the country's pupils

References

6809-based home computers
Thomson computers
Computer science education in France
Computing for All